Gerhard Zwerenz (3 June 1925 in Gablenz, Saxony – 13 July 2015) was a German writer and politician. From 1994 until 1998 he was a member of the Bundestag for the Party of Democratic Socialism (PDS).

Life 
Gerhard Zwerenz was born in Gablenz, a district of Crimmitschau. After an apprenticeship to a coppersmith he enlisted in the Wehrmacht in 1942 and participated in World War II. In 1944 he deserted and became a prisoner of war.

In 1948 he came back to Germany, where he worked as a policeman until 1951. From 1949 until 1957 he was member of the Socialist Unity Party of Germany. After he became ill with tuberculosis he had to stay in a sanatorium. From 1953 until 1956 he studied philosophy under Ernst Bloch at Leipzig University. From 1956 up until his death in 2015 he worked as a writer. In 1957 Zwerenz was expelled from the SED and soon after fled to West-Berlin. Later he and his wife, writer Ingrid Zwerenz, lived in Munich, Cologne, Offenbach am Main and Oberreifenberg/Taunus.

From 1994 until 1998 Zwerenz was a member of the German Bundestag for the PDS.

Zwerenz died on 13 July 2015, aged 90.

Selected works 
 1956: Aristotelische und Brechtsche Dramatik. Versuch einer ästhetischen Wertung (Essays) (Greifen, Rudolstadt)
 1956: Magie, Sternenglaube, Spiritismus, Streifzüge durch den Aberglauben (Urania, Leipzig)
 1959: Die Liebe der toten Männer (Kiepenheuer & Witsch, Köln)
 1959: Aufs Rad geflochten. Roman vom Aufstieg der neuen Klasse (Kiepenheuer & Witsch, Köln)
 1961: Ärgernisse – Von der Maas bis an die Memel (Essays) (Kiepenheuer & Witsch, Köln)
 1962: Gesänge auf dem Markt. Satiren und phantastische Geschichten (Kiepenheuer & Witsch, Köln)
 1962: Wider die deutschen Tabus (Polemik) (List, München)
 1962: Nicht alles gefallen lassen. Schulbuchgeschichten (Fischer TB, Frankfurt)
 1964: Heldengedenktag. Dreizehn Versuche in Prosa, eine ehrerbietige Haltung einzunehmen (Scherz, München)
 1966: Casanova oder der Kleine Herr in Krieg und Frieden (Roman) Scherz, München (1975 als Taschenbuch bei dtv, München)
 1968: Vom Nutzen des dicken Fells und andere Geschichten (Wilhelm Goldmann, München)
 1968: Erbarmen mit den Männern. Roman vom Aschermittwochsfest und den sieben Sinnlichkeiten (Scherz, München)
 1969: Die Lust am Sozialismus (Heinrich-Heine, Frankfurt)
 1970: Leslie Markwart (d.i. G. Z.): Die Zukunft der Männer (Olympia Press, Frankfurt)
 1970: Peer Tarrok (d.i. G. Z.): Rasputin (Joseph Melzer Zero Press, Darmstadt)
 1971: Kopf und Bauch. Die Geschichte eines Arbeiters, der unter die Intellektuellen gefallen ist (Fischer, Frankfurt)
 1972: Der plebejische Intellektuelle (Frankfurt)
 1972: Bericht aus dem Landesinneren. City. Strecke. Siedlung (S. Fischer Verlag, Frankfurt)
 1973: Die Erde ist unbewohnbar wie der Mond (S. Fischer Verlag, Frankfurt)
 1974: Der Widerspruch. Autobiographischer Bericht (Frankfurt)
 1975: Die Quadriga des Mischa Wolf (S. Fischer Verlag, Frankfurt)
 1975: Vorbereitungen zur Hochzeit. Erzählungen (Fischer Taschenbuch, Frankfurt)
 1977: Die Westdeutschen. Erfahrungen, Beschreibungen, Analysen (C. Bertelsmann, München)
 1977: Wozu das ganze Theater. Lustige Geschichten von Schauspielern, Verlegern, von Frankfurt, seiner Buchmesse und vom lieben schönen Tod (Verlag R.S. Schulz, Percha u. Kempfenhausen)
 1978: Das Grosselternkind (Beltz & Gelberg, Weinheim)
 1978: Die schrecklichen Folgen der Legende, ein Liebhaber gewesen zu sein. Erotische Geschichten (Wilhelm Goldmann, München)
 1979: Kurt Tucholsky. Biographie eines guten Deutschen (Bertelsmann, München)
 1979: Die Ehe der Maria Braun (Wilhelm Goldmann, München)
 1979: Ein fröhliches Leben in der Wüste. Roman einer Reise durch drei Tage und drei Nächte (R.S. Schulz, Percha u. Kempfenhausen)
 1980: Die Geschäfte des Herrn Morgenstern (Universitas, München) (1984 edition at Moewig, Rastatt)
 1980: Eine Liebe in Schweden. Roman vom seltsamen Spiel und Tod des Satirikers K. T. (Wilhelm Goldmann, München)
 1980: Salut für einen alten Poeten (Wilhelm Goldmann, München)
 1980: Der Mann und das Mädchen (Moewig, München)
 1980: Rohes Muster. In: Kritik der Tierversuche. Kübler Verlag, Lambertheim 1980, S. 37–40.
 1981: Wir haben jetzt Ruhe in Deutschland (Hoffmann & Campe, Hamburg)
 1981: Il matrimonio di Maria Braun (Translation from German edition 1979) (Rizzoli Editore, Milano)
 1981: Der chinesische Hund (Roman) (Wilhelm Goldmann, München)
 1981: Die 25. Stunde der Liebe (Roman) (Wilhelm Goldmann, München)
 1981: Das Konzept des plebejischen Intellektuellen
 1981: Die lang verlorenen Gefühle (Moewig, München)
 1981: Die Freiheit einer Frau (Moewig, München)
 1981: Der Mann, der seinen Bruder rächte (Moewig, München)
 1981: Schöne Geschichten. Erotische Streifzüge (Wilhelm Goldmann, München)
 1981: Ungezogene Geschichten (Wilhelm Goldmann, München)
 1981: Wüste Geschichten von Liebe und Tod. Erotische Erzählungen (Wilhelm Goldmann, München)
 1982: Der langsame Tod des Rainer Werner Fassbinder. Ein Bericht (Schneekluth, Münchner Edition, München)
 1982: Venus auf dem Vulkan (März Verlag, Berlin & Schlechterwegen)
 1982: Abschied von den Mädchen (Arthur Moewig, Rastatt)
 1982: Der Mann und die Wilde (Arthur Moewig, Rastatt)
 1982: Antwort an einen Friedensfreund oder längere Epistel für Stephan Hermlin und meinen Hund (Bund, Köln)
 1982: Auf den Tod ist kein Verlass. Erotischer Thriller (Wilhelm Goldmann, München)
 1983: Der Bunker (Roman) (Schneekluth, München)
 1983: Der Sex-Knigge. Erotische Spiele über und unter der Bettdecke (with Ingrid Zwerenz) (Delphin, München)
 1983: Schöne Niederlagen. Wie Stories entstehen, und Weltuntergänge (Brennglas, Assenheim)
 1983: Berührungen. Geschichten vom Eros des 20. Jahrhunderts (Knaur, München)
 1983: Erotische Kalendergeschichten (12 Bände) (Wilhelm Goldmann, München)
 1984: Reise unter die Haut (Knaur, München)
 1984: Die Tierschutz-Lady (Moewig, Rastatt)
 1984: Das Lachbuch (Gütersloh)
 1984: Lachen, Liebe, Laster. Erotische Stories (Wilhelm Goldmann, München)
 1985: Die Venusharfe. Liebeslieder, Zorngedichte, Knittelverse (Knaur, München)
 1985: Die DDR wird Kaiserreich. Thriller (Bastei, Bergisch Gladbach)
 1985: Langsamer deutscher Walzer. Thriller (Bastei, Bergisch Gladbach)
 1986: Frisches Blut und alte Krieger. Thriller (Bastei, Bergisch Gladbach)
 1986: Peepshow für den Kommissar. Thriller (Bastei, Bergisch Gladbach)
 1986: Die Rückkehr des toten Juden nach Deutschland (Max Hueber, München)
 1988: "Soldaten sind Mörder". Die Deutschen und der Krieg (Knesebeck & Schuler, München)
 1989: Vergiß die Träume Deiner Jugend nicht (Rasch und Röhring, Hamburg)
 1991: Der Alternative Büchnerpreis 1991 (H.L. Schlapp, Darmstadt)
 1991: Der legitime Krieg? (Zimmermann, Berlin)
 1993: Rechts und dumm (Carlsen, Hamburg)
 1994: Links und lahm. Die Linke stirbt, doch sie ergibt sich nicht (Carlsen, Hamburg)
 1994: Die neue Weltordnung (Zimmermann, Berlin)
 1996: Das Großelternkind (edited as "Ausgabe letzter Hand"; 1978) (Dingsda, Querfurt)
 1997: Die Antworten des Herrn Z. oder Vorsicht, nur für Intellektuelle Published by Ingrid Zwerenz and Joachim Jahns. Additional material: Freunde und Feinde über Zwerenz (Dingsda, Querfurt)
 1998: Unendliche Wende. Ein Streitgespräch (mit Hermann Kant) Hg. Joachim Jahns (Dingsda, Querfurt)
 1999: Die grundsätzliche Differenz. Ein Streitgespräch in Wort und Schrift (with Sahra Wagenknecht) [moderated by: Christa Gießler] (Dingsda, Querfurt)
 2000: Gute Witwen weinen nicht. Exil. Lieben. Tod. Die letzten Jahre Kurt Tucholskys (Kranichsteiner Literaturverlag) (First edition 1980 as Eine Liebe in Schweden)
 2000: Krieg im Glashaus oder Der Bundestag als Windmühle. Autobiographische Aufzeichnungen vom Abgang der Bonner Republik (Edition Ost, Berlin)
 2004: "Rechts Raus," mein Ausstieg aus der Szene. Autobiography of Torsten Lemmer, former right-wing activist. Foreword by Zwerenz. Das Neue Berlin, Berlin, .
 2004: Sklavensprache und Revolte, der Bloch-Kreis und seine Feinde in Ost und West. (mit Ingrid Zwerenz). Schwartzkopff Buchwerke, Hamburg, .

Awards 
 1974: Ernst-Reuter-Preis
 1986: Carl-von-Ossietzky-Preis für Zeitgeschichte und Politik der Stadt Oldenburg
 1991: Alternativer Georg-Büchner-Preis

Further reading 
 Siegmar Faust: Zwerenz, Gerhard. In: Wer war wer in der DDR? 5th edition. Ch. Links, Berlin 2010, .

References

External links 
 
 
 
 Gerhard Zwerenz at LeMO
 Gerhard Zwerenz at Poetenladen

1925 births
2015 deaths
People from Crimmitschau
Socialist Unity Party of Germany members
Party of Democratic Socialism (Germany) politicians
The Left (Germany) politicians
Members of the Bundestag for Hesse
Members of the Bundestag 1994–1998
East German writers
German male writers
Writers from Saxony
21st-century German politicians
Leipzig University alumni
German military personnel of World War II
German prisoners of war in World War II held by the Soviet Union
Members of the Bundestag for the Party of Democratic Socialism (Germany)
Deserters